100 series may refer to:

Japanese train types
 100 Series Shinkansen, a Japanese Shinkansen high-speed train type
 Choshi Electric Railway 100 series electric multiple unit
 Keisei AE100 series electric multiple unit
 KiHa 100 series diesel multiple unit
 Meitetsu 100 series electric multiple unit
 Tobu 100 series Spacia electric multiple unit

Other
 100-series highways (Nova Scotia), a series of arterial highways in the Canadian province of Nova Scotia
 Lenovo IdeaPad 100, a discontinued brand of notebook computers
 GeForce 100 series graphics proccesing units produced by Nvidia

See also

 Series 1
 100s (disambiguation)
 100 (disambiguation)
 1000 series (disambiguation)